Sergei Stupin (September 14, 1979) is a Russian professional ice hockey defenceman who currently plays for Avtomobilist Yekaterinburg of the Kontinental Hockey League (KHL).

References

External links

Living people
Avtomobilist Yekaterinburg players
1979 births
Russian ice hockey defencemen